, referred to as Big Egg City before January 1, 2000, is an entertainment complex in Bunkyo, Tokyo, Japan.

It also includes the world's largest roofed baseball stadium, known as Tokyo Dome (AKA "Big Egg"); an amusement park known as Tokyo Dome City Attractions (formerly Kōrakuen Yūenchi); and Korakuen Hall.  In May 2003, a spa resort known as LaQua opened for business near Tokyo Dome City Attractions. It also hosts character shows for Toei Company's Toei Superheroes, including the Kamen Rider and Super Sentai series (the Tokyo Dome Corporation is the Super Sentai series' main sponsor).

The Tokyo Dome City contains the Tokyo Dome Hotel, a 43-story hotel that is easy to spot from the street and from the Tokyo Subway Suidobashi Station, which is only two blocks away.

Tokyo Dome City facilities

 Tokyo Dome baseball stadium
 LaQua
 a building that houses a spa, fitness center and shopping mall
 amusement park rides including Big O and Thunder Dolphin
 Tokyo Dome City Attractions amusement park
 Theatre G-Rosso
 Tokyo Dome Hotel
 Yellow Building
 Sauna Tokyo Dome, Korakuen Hall sports arena
 Blue Building
 Tokyo Dome Bowling Center, Off-track betting (Wins Korekauen)
 MEETS PORT
Tokyo Dome City Hall

Transportation
 Kōrakuen Station of several subway lines, integrated within the complex
 Kasuga Station of several subway lines, to the north
 Suidōbashi Station, a JR line station across a street from Tokyo Dome City

See also
 Koishikawa Korakuen Garden is immediately to the west of the area.

External links

 Tokyo Dome City official website

2000 establishments in Japan
Buildings and structures in Bunkyō